Macrochia texata is a species of beetle in the family Cerambycidae, and the only species in the genus Macrochia. It was described by Chevrolat in 1858.

References

Pachystolini
Beetles described in 1858
Taxa named by Louis Alexandre Auguste Chevrolat